The Hand That Rocks the Cradle may refer to:

"The Hand That Rocks the Cradle" (poem), an 1865 poem by William Ross Wallace
The Hand That Rocks the Cradle (1917 film), a 1917 silent film
The Hand That Rocks the Cradle (film), a 1992 thriller starring Rebecca De Mornay and Annabella Sciorra
"The Hand That Rocks the Cradle" (song), a 1987 song by Glen Campbell and Steve Wariner
"The Hand That Rocks the Cradle", a song by The Smiths from The Smiths
"The Hand That Rocks the Cradle", a song by Black Sabbath from Cross Purposes